This is a list of Mexican football transfers in the Mexican Primera Division during the summer 2013 transfer window, grouped by club. It only includes football clubs from Liga MX, the first division of Mexican football.

Mexican Primera Division

América

In:

Out:

Atlante

In:

Out:

Atlas

In:

Out:

Chiapas

In:

Out:

Cruz Azul

In:

Out:

Guadalajara

In:

Out:

León

In:

Out:

Monterrey

In:

 

Out:

Morelia

In:

Santiago Tréllez Vivero
Out:

Pachuca

In:

Out:

Puebla

In:

Out:

Querétaro

In:

Out:

Santos Laguna

In:

Out:

Tijuana

In:

Out:

Toluca

In:

Out:

UANL

In:

Out:

UNAM

In:

Out:

Veracruz

In:

Out:

See also 
 2013–14 Liga MX season

References

 The previous Chiapas franchise was bought by Querétaro, who were relegated. This new franchise is San Luis under a new name and location. Players that were property of San Luis are now property of Chiapas.
 This new Querétaro team is composed of a combination of the original Chiapas players and the relegated original Querétaro. Players who were property of Chiapas are now Querétaro's players.
 Though La Piedad was the promoted team, it changed its name and location to Veracruz

References 

Summer 2013
Mexico
Tran
Tran